U. mexicana  may refer to:
 Ulmus mexicana, the Mexican elm, a large deciduous tree species endemic to Mexico and Central America
 Urophora mexicana, a fruit fly species

See also
 Mexicana (disambiguation)